Howrah is a residential locality in the local government area (LGA) of Clarence in the Hobart LGA region of Tasmania. The 2021 Census recorded a population of 9,545 for the state suburb of Howrah.
It is a suburb of the City of Clarence.  It is east of Bellerive and north of Tranmere.

Howrah is a beachside suburb, with views across the Derwent River to Hobart City. Clarence Street runs through the centre of the suburb separating the hillside section from the beachside.

Howrah has a number of parks including Wentworth Park, which is one of the key sport (such as soccer, field hockey and touch football) and recreation areas on the Eastern Shore.

Clarence High School is generally thought to be in Howrah, due to it being located east of Wentworth Street, however it is in Bellerive. Howrah has a primary school.

Shoreline Shopping Centre is the largest shopping centre in Howrah.

History 
Howrah was gazetted as a locality in 1963.

Howrah was named after Howrah House, a property established in the 1830s on Clarence Plains by a retired Indian Army officer who took the name from a place of the same name near Calcutta.

Geography
The waters of the River Derwent form the south-western boundary.

Road infrastructure
Route B33 (South Arm Highway) runs through from north-west to east.

References

Beaches of Tasmania
Localities of City of Clarence